British actress Emily Blunt has received numerous awards and nominations for her work in film.

Major awards

British Academy Film Awards

Britannia Awards

Critics' Choice Movie Awards

Golden Globe Awards

Screen Actors Guild Awards

Other awards

Alliance of Women Film Journalists Awards

Australian Academy of Cinema and Television Arts Awards

British Independent Film Awards

Chicago Film Critics Association

Dallas–Fort Worth Film Critics Association

Detroit Film Critics Society

Dublin Film Critics' Circle

Empire Awards

Evening Standard British Film Awards

Fangoria Chainsaw Awards

Georgia Film Critics Association Awards

Gold Derby Awards

Gotham Independent Film Awards

Hawaii Film Critics Society

Houston Film Critics Society

Jupiter Awards

London Film Critics' Circle

MTV Movie & TV Awards

Nickelodeon Kids' Choice Awards

Palm Springs International Film Festival Awards

People's Choice Awards

Santa Barbara International Film Festival Awards

Satellite Awards

Saturn Awards

Scream Awards

St. Louis Film Critics Association

Teen Choice Awards

Vancouver Film Critics Circle

Women in Film Crystal + Lucy Awards

References

Blunt, Emily